Kenny Brooks (born December 20, 1968) is the current head coach of the Virginia Tech women's basketball team.

Career
Brooks played his collegiate basketball for the James Madison Dukes basketball program.

During the 2013–2014 season the James Madison University women's basketball team upset the 6 seed Gonzaga in the NCAA tournament. It was JMU's first NCAA tournament victory since 1991.

He was introduced as the  James Madison University women's basketball head coach March 21, 2003. He served as the interim head coach for the 2002–2003 season.

Brooks is of regular season games in the women's basketball program history the winningest coach (303), surpassing Shelia Moorman (302). Brooks was the head coach when the James Madison University Women's Basketball Team became the third school in NCAA Women's Basketball history to win 1,000 program games.

He tied the school record for wins in a season with 29 (2011–2012, 2013–2014).

On February 6, 2015, Brooks beat Hofstra University, (77–68), giving him his 300th career win.

On March 28, 2016, Brooks accepted the same position at Virginia Tech.

Head coaching record

References

1968 births
Living people
American men's basketball players
American women's basketball coaches
Basketball coaches from Virginia
Basketball players from Virginia
James Madison Dukes men's basketball coaches
James Madison Dukes men's basketball players
James Madison Dukes women's basketball coaches
People from Waynesboro, Virginia
Virginia Tech Hokies women's basketball coaches
VMI Keydets basketball coaches